This article lists the chapters of FarmHouse in order of founding.  Some chapters listed are no longer active in the fraternity and are noted.

As of March 23, 2022, expansion efforts were underway to reestablish a chapter at University of Idaho and associate chapters (formerly known as colonies) exist at University of Central Missouri and University of Texas at Tyler.

List of chapters

References

chapters
Lists of chapters of United States student societies by society